Head in the Clouds is a compilation album by musical collective 88rising. It was released through 88rising and 12Tone Music on July 20, 2018. Guest appearances include Yung Bans, Yung Pinch, 03 Greedo, BlocBoy JB, Vory, Phum Viphurit, Playboi Carti, Famous Dex, Verbal, GoldLink and Harikiri.

Promotion and release 
On May 7, 2018, Sean Miyashiro, the founder and CEO of the mass media company 88rising, announced their inaugural music festival called "Head in the Clouds" which would take place at the Los Angeles State Historic Park on September 22, 2018. With the announcement, the collective of artists under the label would also release a group album with the same name to accompany the festival. 

On July 19, 2018, Joji and Rich Brian joined Sean Evans on First We Feast's Hot Ones to promote both the album and festival. They also partnered with First We Feast to create a cooking show based on their stay in Los Angeles titled Feast Mansion which premiered on 26 September 2018.

On July 24, 2018, August 08, Rich Brian, and Joji were guests on MTV's TRL and performed a live rendition of "Midsummer Madness".

Track listing 
All credits adapted from Tidal.

Charts

References 

2018 compilation albums
Collaborative albums
88rising albums